Salem High School may refer to a school in the United States:

North Salem High School (Salem, Oregon), formerly known as Salem High School
Salem High School (Arkansas)
Salem High School (Conyers, Georgia)
Salem High School (Indiana) 
Salem High School (Massachusetts) 
Salem High School, in the Plymouth-Canton Educational Park, Canton, Michigan
Salem High School (New Hampshire) 
Salem High School (New Jersey)
Salem High School (Ohio) 
Salem High School (Salem, Virginia)
Salem High School (Virginia Beach, Virginia)

See also
Salem Academy (disambiguation)
Salem School (disambiguation)